James Smith Reid, FBA (1846–1926) was an English author, scholar and historian.

He was educated at the City of London School, which was then in Milk Street, Cheapside, whose masters included Joseph Hirst Lupton.

He was appointed the first Professor of Ancient History at the University of Cambridge, serving from 1899 to 1925.

He was author of numerous articles in the Encyclopædia Britannica (11th ed., 1911) and a great number of Latin textbooks, and also translated Cicero's Academica.

Works
[https://archive.org/details/cu31924028267353 The Municipalities of the Roman Empire] (Cambridge: University Press, 1913)

References 

1846 births
1926 deaths
19th-century English historians
20th-century English historians
Professors of Ancient History (Cambridge)